Port Moller (Sugpiaq: Putmaaluq) is an unincorporated community in the Aleutians East Borough, in the U.S. state of Alaska. It is named after the bay of the same name, which was in turn named for the sloop Moller, used by Captain M.N. Staniukovich, of Captain Friedrich Benjamin von Lütke's expedition, to explore the bay in 1828.

References

Unincorporated communities in Alaska
Unincorporated communities in Aleutians East Borough, Alaska